McTyeire may refer to:

People
Holland Nimmons McTyeire (1824–1889), American Methodist bishop, Vanderbilt University co-founder, and slavery advocate
Rex H. McTyeire, co-founder of the far-right militia Oath Keepers in the U.S.
Holland McTyeire Smith (1882–1967), American marine general
Holland Thompson (Holland McTyeire Thompson; 1873–1940), American historian

Places
McTyeire, Georgia, a town now known as Young Harris, Georgia, U.S.

Schools
McTyeire College, a defunct Methodist college in McKenzie, Tennessee, U.S.
McTyeire  Hall, a residential building at Vanderbilt University in Nashville, Tennessee, U.S.
McTyeire Institute, now known as Young Harris College, in Georgia, U.S.
McTyeire School, in Shanghai, China

See also
 McTyer (disambiguation)